Odesa National Music Academy named after AV Nezhdanova or Odesa Conservatory is a Ukrainian state institution of higher music education. Its courses include postgraduate education.

History
The Odesa Conservatory was established in 1913 on the foundation of the music college (opened in 1897) of the Odesa branch of the Imperial Russian Music Society. The founder of the conservatory was a prominent Polish composer, conductor and teacher Witold Maliszewski (1873-1939), a student of Nikolai Rimsky-Korsakov and Oleksandr Glazunov, and a teacher of Mykola Vilinsky and Witold Lutosławski.

In 1923 it was divided into a music institute and a technical school, which in 1928 were merged into the Music and Drama Institute.

In 1934 the Odesa Conservatory was re-established in the previous form. In 1950 it was named after the outstanding opera singer Antonina Nezhdanova.

On May 8, 2012, by the decree of the President of Ukraine, the conservatory was renamed to academy and granted the national status.

References

External links
Official site

Music schools in Ukraine
Universities and colleges in Odesa